Sam Akromah (born 19 March 1960) is a Ghanaian former professional boxer who competed from 1980 to 1995. He held the Ghanaian lightweight title, Ghanaian super featherweight title, and Commonwealth super featherweight title, and was a challenger for both the African Boxing Union lightweight title against Christopher Ossai, and Ghanaian light welterweight title against Kofi Jantuah. His professional fighting weight varied from super featherweight to light welterweight.

References

External links

1960 births
Lightweight boxers
Light-welterweight boxers
Living people
Super-featherweight boxers
Ghanaian male boxers
African Boxing Union champions
People from Tamale, Ghana